Innitagnostus is a genus of trilobite in the order Agnostida, which existed in what is now Queensland, Australia. It was described by Öpik, 1967, and the type species is Innitagnostus innitens.

References

Agnostidae
Agnostida genera
Trilobites of Australia
Fauna of Queensland
Paleozoic life of Newfoundland and Labrador
Paleozoic life of Yukon